The James Clerk Maxwell Prize for Plasma Physics is an annual American Physical Society (APS) award that is given in recognition of outstanding contributions to the field of the Plasma Physics. It was established in 1975 by Maxwell Technologies, Inc, in honor of the Scottish physicist James Clerk Maxwell. It is currently sponsored by General Atomics. The prize includes a $10,000 USD monetary award and recognition at the annual American Physical Society Division of Plasma Physics conference.

Recipients

See also
 Hannes Alfvén Prize
 List of physics awards
 List of prizes named after people

References

External links
Official Website

Awards of the American Physical Society
Awards established in 1975